Running with Violet is a Canadian comedy-drama web series created by and starring Rebecca Davey and Marie-Claire Marcotte. The series premiered on a dedicated YouTube channel on February 13, 2017. As of January 2020, Running with Violet had generated over 1.5 million views on YouTube.

In 2020, it was announced that the series will be broadcast on OutTV in the 2020-21 television season.

Plot
In fictional smalltown Pictonville, Ontario, housewife Miranda and single mother Jolene attempt a weekend holiday with Jolene's daughter, toddler Violet, in tow. After a series of unfortunate events, they find themselves on the run from a small-town meth gang and the law, and must navigate a web of dangerous crime to survive.

Season 2 finds the two friends getting caught up in a beauty and wellness pyramid scheme, only to discover it is a front for pushing drugs. With dreams of big money, the women try to make the most of their situation while dealing with the escalating stakes around them.

Cast and characters

Main characters 

 Jolene (played by Rebecca Davey) is fourth generation Pictonville resident. She was born in the small town and can't imagine any different. She started cutting hair right out of high school at her mother's salon. When her mother died she took over the salon and moved her and her daughter to the family farm to take care of her ailing father. Jolene is a single mother to her energetic toddler Violet and works like a dog to make ends meet.
 Miranda (played by Marie-Claire Marcotte) is a meek housewife trapped in an abusive marriage to Blair. She married Blair when she was nineteen to getaway from her controlling religious family, only to find herself shackled to a man even more domineering. Blair's manipulation has undermined her courage. Miranda is uptight about her appearance, having convinced herself that her value lies in her good looks. Her only ‘friend’ in town is Jolene and Miranda's weekly hair salon visits are the highlight of her week.
Xorge (played by Amy Matysio) is Stella's ruthless younger sister who left Pictonville at a young age to establish her beauty and wellness company Bae Mine, now a major business empire which she remains the queen-pin of. She is currently looking to expand back into her hometown.
Samantha (played by Andrea Bang) is Xorge's party-loving girlfriend who does most of the work involved in selling the Bae Mine beauty empire. Samantha has developed a bit of a pill-popping problem to mitigate the more stressful parts of her job.
Violet (played by Violet Alfred) is a charming three-year-old. Her and her mom, Jolene, are inseparable and custody weekends with dad Nick are hard on them both. Jolene desperately wants a different life for her daughter where she will not be bound by the limits of a narrow town.
 Frankie (played by Jessii Vee) is a local teenager who babysits for Jolene. She's super attached to Violet, having been her baby-sitter since day one. Her relationship with her mom is currently fraught not because of the decision she made to put down the family cat (who was also her best friend) without telling her.

Supporting characters 

 Blair (played by Jamie Spilchuk) is the town good boy and businessman who has a dark side that not even his wife Miranda sees. He is deeply involved Pictonville's meth ring, hiding meth in his basement and car.
 Stella (played by Claire Armstrong) owns a diner just outside of town. She likes the constant flow of customers and regularly takes in stragglers passing through town. She was born into the meth ring and, being the daughter of its kingpin Daddy, remains stuck in it. She's still reeling from her twelve-year-old son's disappearance, holding out hope that he's still alive.
 Gary (played by John Boylan) is Jolene's emotionally needy father. He's not that sick, but regularly pretends to have new ailment. He has become romantically involved with Daddy, though he remains completely unaware of her involvement in the town meth ring.
 Daddy (played by Maria Vacratsis) is Stella's mother and ever since anyone can remember, has always gone by the name of Daddy. Daddy is ruthless and emotionally stunted. She wanted her grandson to participate in the meth ring, seeing great leadership potential in him. She tries to keep her grandson's tragic ending a secret from Stella.
 Nick (played by John Cleland) is Jolene's ex and the police officer in town. He's on a mission to bring down the town meth ring. He loves his daughter, though has not fought Jolene on getting full custody, hoping that his congeniality might make Jolene relent and come back to him. While waiting for Jolene to ‘come around’, he's gotten romantically involved with Frankie's mom.
 Stewart (played by Shannon Kook) is an undercover cop. He works partnered with Rosa, and is the lazy one of the two. Preferring to eat donuts, he tends to sit back and only get his butt moving if it's a direct order.
 Rosa (played by Debora Demestre) is a hardworking undercover cop. She's attracted to Miranda and though her job always comes first, Miranda tests her ability to flirt and work at the same time.
 Astrid (played by Katherine Gauthier) and Grete (played by Jonelle Gunderson) are two peppy Norwegians charged with investigating and reporting back on Pictonville's Green Soil Project. Astrid has a PhD in biochemistry and Greta is her graduate student. They are the ying to each other's yang having spent so many hours in the lab together.
 Ranger (played by Peyson Rock) and Deedee (played by Sabryn Rock) are a pair of twin drug dealers who buy meth from Daddy. They are careful to make sure Daddy is kept happy at all times.
 Teddy (played by Kevan Kase) is a member of another gang in Pictonville which ‘owns’ the highway. They're not as big as Daddy's gang but desperately try to be.
 Sue-Anne (played by Rachelle Casseus)
 Sister Diane (played by Djennie Laguerre)
 Wanda (played by Diana Durango)
Anna (played by Rakhee Morzaria)
Simone (played by Camille Stopps)
Bev (played by Getenesh Berhe)
Gigi (played by Sarah Nat Afful)
Janet (played by Precious Chong)
Missy (played by Patricia Marceau)
Carmen (played by Anita La Selva)
Janet (played by Lara Mrkoci)
Bernadette (played by Kyra Harper)
Bob (played by Alex Weiner)
Martha (played by Sera-Lys McArthur)
Eddy (played by Neil Whitely)
Pierre (played by Jameson Kraemer)
Carl (played by Hamed Dar)

Episodes

Season 1 (2017)

Season 2 (2019–2020)

Production
The series was funded through the Independent Production Fund, the Ontario Media Development Corporation Interactive Digital Media Fund, and the St. Petersburg Clearwater Film Commission. After initial production, the series received additional funding through a 2016 Indiegogo crowdfunding campaign that raised over $12,600 CAD.

The first season of Running With Violet was screened at Sunscreen Film Festival, Sunscreen Film Festival West, Austin Web Fest, Toronto Web Fest, Wendie Webfest Hamburg, Melbourne WebFest, SeriesFest, Newark International Film Festival, Lift-Off Global Network (Los Angeles, Paris, Vancouver, and Sydney), Web Series Festival Global, Webfest Berlin, UK Web Fest, Rio WebFest, Open World Toronto Film Festival, Blackbird Film Festival, Marseille Web Fest, and Canada Independent Film Festival.

The second season of Running with Violet was completed in 2019. The first three episodes of the season were released on YouTube before the series received network sales to OUTtv and ERT. The second season was screened at Bilbao Seriesland, Los Angeles Film Awards, Minnesota WebFest, NZ Web Fest, Open World Toronto Film Festival, Queen Palm International Film Festival, Rio Webfest, Sunscreen Film Fest West, Baltimore Next Media Web Fest, Santa Monica Webfest, Seattle Transmedia & Independent Film Festival, UK Web Fest, Web Series Festival Global, and Webfest Berlin.

Reception
Katheryn Trammell of Starry Constellation Magazine described the first season of Running With Violet as "one of a few new shows that represent the future of web series production... to put it more simply this web series looks, acts and feels like a movie, but it does so organically," while also praising its writing for "a tone of comedy I haven't seen this well-executed since the last time I watched Fargo." Matt Fagerholm of rogerebert.com called the show "highly enjoyable", while Joël Bassaget of Web Series Mag wrote "[i]t's a really entertaining show with a perfect rhythm, a clever script and very good acting."

She Does the City described season 2 as something that "will likely remind some viewers of Fargo, Weeds, or Breaking Bad" but "is its own beautiful masterpiece." Siân Melton of Muff Society praised the second season, calling it "just as captivating and intense as the first, but the stakes are even higher." Hollywood North Mag called it "a blend of extremely dark comedy where it either comes off as very funny or very disturbing, which makes it all that more interesting and gripping to watch." Blogger Nerdy Girl Express praised it as "one of the most unexpected series I have ever had the pleasure of watching", and Parker & The Picture Shows called it "one of those rare little gems."

Awards and nominations

References

External links
  official site
 
 

2017 web series debuts
2017 web series endings
Canadian comedy-drama web series
Lesbian-related television shows
Canadian LGBT-related web series
YouTube original programming
2010s Canadian LGBT-related comedy television series
OutTV (Canadian TV channel) original programming
2010s Canadian LGBT-related drama television series